Sue Banks (born 7 February 1972) is an Australian sports shooter. She competed in the women's 10 metre air rifle event at the 1996 Summer Olympics.

References

External links
 

1972 births
Living people
Australian female sport shooters
Olympic shooters of Australia
Shooters at the 1996 Summer Olympics
Sportspeople from Adelaide
20th-century Australian women
21st-century Australian women